Mount Shibutsu (至仏山 Shifutsu/Shibutsu-san) is a serpentine mountain in the north-east of Gunma Prefecture in Japan. It's one of the 100 Famous Japanese Mountains and is home to a "treasure trove" of alpine plants. It is part of Oze National Park and the Minakami UNESCO Eco Park.

Mountain climbing 
The mountain can be climbed from April through November, and summitting takes about 3 hours.

Hence, Mt. Shibutsu is a part of Oze National Park, access to the area is prohibited to protect vegetation during the remaining snow season by the Oze Reservation Foundation.  Normally, no entry period is from May to June. Check up the Oze Reservation Foundation web site for more details.

Flora 
The mountain is home to several rare plant species that thrive in the serpentine soils, including Arenaria katoana, Leontopodium fauriei, and Japonolirion osense.

References

External links

 The Oze Preservation Foundation english website
 

Parks and gardens in Gunma Prefecture
National parks of Japan
Protected areas established in 2007
Mountains of Gunma Prefecture